Asgarabad (also Romanized as ʿAsgarābād; also known as Aşgharābād) is a village in Zarrineh Rud-e Jonubi Rural District, in the Central District of Miandoab County, West Azerbaijan Province, Iran. At the 2006 census, its population was 147, in 28 families.

References 

Populated places in Miandoab County